Potoki is a village in the Municipality of Semič in Slovenia. The railway line from Novo Mesto to Metlika runs just east of the settlement. The area is part of the historical region of Lower Carniola. The municipality is now included in the Southeast Slovenia Statistical Region.

References

External links
Potoki at Geopedia

Populated places in the Municipality of Semič